{{safesubst:#invoke:RfD|||month = March
|day = 15
|year = 2023
|time = 22:40
|timestamp = 20230315224044

|content=
REDIRECT Food, Glorious Food

}}